Herbison v Papakura Video Ltd [1987] 2 NZLR 527 is a cited case in New Zealand regarding the enforceability of Exclusion clauses.

Held
The court held that considering all the facts in the case, the exclusion clause was legally valid. On this, Henry J said '"...the factors to be taken into account in deciding whether it is fair and reasonable that the disclaimer should be conclusive:In favour of conclusiveness:

1. The transaction involved the sale of a business at the reasonably substantial figure of $385,000.

2. There was no disparity between the respective bargaining strengths of the parties.

3. Both parties were in receipt of competent legal advice at the time of critical negotiation.

4. The precise wording of special terms, included in which was the disclaimer, was the subject of detailed negotiation before being finalised.

5. The very schedule which comprises the misrepresentation was included as a warranted document in a draft of the agreement and was men deliberately and knowingly replaced by the monthly analysis of receipts.

6. Both [parties] were experienced in business and had taken the precaution of employing specialist accounting assistance before agreeing to purchase.

7. The disclaimer is not part of a standard form of agreement but is contained in the body of a clause specially drafted with particularity which carefully sets out the representations upon which the purchasers rely and expressly excludes all others.Against conclusiveness''':

8. The purchasers in fact placed reliance on the accuracy of the monthly figures.

9. The hire component as a proportion of turnover was an aspect important to the purchasers.

10. The monthly figures bear a close relationship to material included in the contractual documents.
Looked at overall, I have reached the conclusion that the balance is weighted, quite strongly, in favour of the vendor and that in all the circumstances the provision should be given effect and be conclusive as between the parties. The result of this is that the misrepresentation is of no effect and cannot afford the plaintiffs a ground for relief."''''

References

High Court of New Zealand cases
New Zealand contract case law
1987 in New Zealand law
1987 in case law